Areia Branca is a municipality located in the Brazilian state of Sergipe. Areia Branca has a population density of 120 inhabitants per square kilometer. The municipality contains part of the Serra de Itabaiana National Park.

References

Municipalities in Sergipe
Populated places established in 1963